Catch a Rising Star is a Canadian variety television series which aired on CBC Television in 1976.

Premise
Tommy Hunter hosted this series which introduced emerging Canadian performers. They were joined by professional guest artists such as Julie Amato, Dave Broadfoot, Dinah Christie, Jack Duffy, Barbara Hamilton, Juliette, Catherine McKinnon, Billy Van, Bill Walker and Al Waxman.

Scheduling
This hour-long series was broadcast on Fridays at 9:00 p.m. (Eastern) from 7 May to 11 June 1976.

Reception
Joan Irwin of the Montreal Gazette blasted the series as an "inept series" and a "trashy offering".

See also
 Canadian Idol

References

External links
 

CBC Television original programming
1976 Canadian television series debuts
1976 Canadian television series endings